Michael Jay Shuman (born August 20, 1985), also known as Mikey Shoes, is an American musician and songwriter. He is best known for playing bass with rock band Queens of the Stone Age. He also sings and plays the guitar and various other instruments in Mini Mansions, and formerly co-fronted Wires on Fire and Jubilee.

From 2021 to 2023, Shuman was in a relationship with English actress Lily James.

Life and career
Shuman graduated Loyola Marymount University in Los Angeles, California and attended Campbell Hall High School in North Hollywood, California, Portola Middle School in Tarzana, California, and Lanai Road Elementary School in Encino, California.

Shuman co-founded, co-fronted, and played bass for Jubilee until late 2008, and is the bassist of Wires On Fire, both on Buddyhead Records. He joined Queens of the Stone Age in 2007 before the release of Era Vulgaris, replacing Alain Johannes, who chose to focus on other musical projects.

In 2013, Queens of the Stone Age released ...Like Clockwork, their first full album since Shuman joined the band. On the album, Shuman provides vocals and plays bass, percussion, guitar, twelve-string guitar, and Mellotron. The album was the first Queens of the Stone Age album to reach number one on the Billboard 200. It also reached number two on the UK Albums Chart and was nominated for three Grammy Awards, including Best Rock Album.

Shuman contributed to the soundtrack of the video game Grand Theft Auto V in 2013, working alongside other musicians on the game's score. He also created the soundtrack for the 2017 drama film Feed.

In 2022, Shuman announced a new solo project under the name GLU. He has since released three singles under GLU, "Cold Sweat", “Night Shift”, and "My Demons" featuring Sara Barthel of the band Phantogram, as well as a five-song EP entitled “My Demons EP”.

Discography

Appearances on albums
2004 – Wires on Fire – Homewrecker
2006 – Wires on Fire – Wires on Fire
2007 – Queens of the Stone Age – 'Era Vulgaris *
2009 – Hello=Fire – Hello=Fire2009 – Mini Mansions – Mini Mansions EP2011 – Mini Mansions – Mini Mansions2013 – Queens of the Stone Age – ...Like Clockwork2013 - Various Artists - The Music of Grand Theft Auto V2014 - Brody Dalle - Diploid Love2014 - Kimbra - The Golden Echo2015 – Mini Mansions – The Great Pretenders2016 - Xu Xu Fang - Daylong Secret2017 – Queens of the Stone Age – Villains2018 – Mini Mansions – Works Every Time EP2019 – Mini Mansions – Guy Walks Into a Bar...Appearances on singles
2005 – Wires on Fire – "Mean Reds/Wires on Fire" (split single)
2007 – Queens of the Stone Age – "Sick, Sick, Sick" **
2007 – Queens of the Stone Age – "3's & 7's" **
2007 – Queens of the Stone Age – "Make It Wit Chu" **
2008 – Jubilee – "Rebel Hiss"
2008 – Jubilee – "In With the Out Crowd"
2009 – Hello=Fire – "Nature of Our Minds"
2009 – Mini Mansions – "Heart of Glass"
2010 – Mini Mansions – "Kiddie Hypnogogia"
2010 – Mini Mansions – "Wünderbars"
2013 – Queens of the Stone Age – "My God Is the Sun"
2013 – Queens of the Stone Age – "I Sat by the Ocean"
2014 – Queens of the Stone Age – "Smooth Sailing"
2014 – Mini Mansions - "Death Is A Girl"
2015 – Mini Mansions - "Any Emotions"
2015 – Mini Mansions - "Freakout!"
2015 – Mini Mansions - "Vertigo"
2018 – Mini Mansions - "Works Every Time"
2018 – Mini Mansions - "Midnight in Tokyo"
2019 – Mini Mansions - "GummyBear"
2019 – Mini Mansions - "Hey Lover"
2019 – Mini Mansions - "Bad Things (That Make You Feel Good)"
2019 – Mini Mansions - "I'm in Love" "*" = Marks appearances on bonus tracks and "**" marks appearances on B-sides.''

References

External links

Official Jubilee site
Jubilee MySpace
Official Queens of the Stone Age site
Wires on Fire site
Wires on Fire MySpace
Isolate by the hour – An amateur's guide to Jubilee
Mikey on Myspace

1985 births
Living people
American rock bass guitarists
American male bass guitarists
Queens of the Stone Age members
21st-century American bass guitarists